The 1970 Peach Bowl was a college football bowl game between the Arizona State Sun Devils and the North Carolina Tar Heels.

Background
The Sun Devils were champions of the Western Athletic Conference once again and were aiming for a perfect season. The Tar Heels finished tied for second in the Atlantic Coast Conference. Arizona State was invited after Penn State declined. A blizzard developed before gametime, with rain, sleet, and snow coming out in all throughout the game.

Game summary
Bob Thomas helped the Sun Devils jump out to a 14–0 lead before the Tar Heels responded in the second quarter with a Don McCauley touchdown run. J. D. Hill caught a touchdown pass from Joe Spagnola to make it 21–7 before the Tar heels exploded for 19 points before the quarter ended. McCauley ran for two touchdowns along with teammate Blanchard to give the Heels a 26–21 halftime lead. But the second half is where the Sun Devils took control, scoring 27 unanswered points on two touchdown runs by both Monroe Eley and touchdown runs by Thomas and Steve Holden to give the Sun Devils their first ever bowl win. Eley rushed for 173 yards to earn co-MVP honors while Junior Ah You earned co-MVP honors for knocking out quarterback Paul Miller.

Aftermath
The Tar Heels would win three conference titles before Dooley left after the 1977 season. They have returned to this bowl four times since this game, the last time in 2001. The Sun Devils finished ranked #6 in the polls. They would win five more conference titles before Kush's ouster in 1979. The Sun Devils have not returned to this game since. This was the final Peach Bowl played at Grant Field as it would move to Atlanta Stadium the following year.

Scoring summary
ASU – Thomas 8 run (Ekstrand kick)
ASU – Thomas 33 run (Ekstrand kick)
NC – McCauley 1 run (Craven kick)
ASU – Hill 67 pass from Spagnola (Ekstrand kick)
NC – Blanchard 36 pass from Miller (Craven kick)
NC – McCauley 17 run (kick failed)
NC – McCauley 4 run (pass failed)
ASU – Eley 8 run (Ekstrand kick)
ASU – Holden 13 run (kick failed)
ASU – Eley 5 run (Ekstrand kick)
ASU – Thomas 2 run (Ekstrand kick)

References

Peach Bowl
Peach Bowl
Arizona State Sun Devils football bowl games
North Carolina Tar Heels football bowl games
1970 in sports in Georgia (U.S. state)
December 1970 sports events in the United States